The following are the football (soccer) events of the year 1972 throughout the world.

Events
 24 May – Copa Libertadores 1972: Won by Independiente after defeating Universitario de Deportes on an aggregate score of 2-1.
 11 May – Ajax Amsterdam claims the Dutch Cup by defeating FC Den Haag: 3-2.
 12 October – the 1972–73 Honduran League was canceled due to economic problems.
 18 November 1972 –1972 Scotland v England women's football match

Winners club national championship

Asia
: Al-Sadd SC

Europe
: Vejle BK
: Magdeburg
: Derby County
: Olympique de Marseille
: Újpest FC
: Juventus
: Ajax Amsterdam
: Zorya Voroshilovgrad
: Real Madrid
: Galatasaray S.K.
: Bayern Munich

North America
: Cruz Azul
 / :
New York Cosmos (NASL)

South America

San Lorenzo - Metropolitano
San Lorenzo - Nacional
: Palmeiras

International tournaments
 African Cup of Nations in Cameroon (February 23 – March 5, 1972)
 
 
 
1972 British Home Championship (May 20 – May 27, 1972)

 UEFA European Football Championship in Belgium (June 14 – 18 1972)
 
 
 
Olympic Games in Munich, West Germany (August 26 – September 10, 1972)
 
 
  and

Births

 January 1 – Lilian Thuram, French international footballer
 January 2 – Eduardo Pereira, Timorese footballer
 January 3 – Manuel Martínez, Mexican international footballer
 January 8 
 Paul Clement, English footballer, coach, and manager
 Giuseppe Favalli, Italian footballer
 Esteban Valencia, Chilean international footballer
 January 11 – Huub Loeffen, Dutch footballer
 January 16
 Ruben Bagger, Danish footballer
 Yuri Alekseevich Drozdov, Russian footballer
 Ezra Hendrickson, Vincentian footballer
 Alen Peternac, Croatian footballer
 January 29 – Joseph Oosting, Dutch footballer
 February 11 – Steve McManaman, English international footballer
 March 3 – Karel Poborský, Czech international footballer
 March 17 – Mia Hamm, American footballer
 March 23 – Daniel Prodan, Romanian international footballer (died 2016)
 March 28 – Péter Lipcsei, Hungarian footballer
 March 29 – Rui Costa, Portuguese footballer
 April 28 – Jean-Paul van Gastel, Dutch footballer
 April 28 – Wilmer Velásquez, Honduran international footballer
 May 8 – José Alberto Guadarrama, Mexican footballer
 May 10 – Radosław Majdan, Polish goalkeeper
 June 15 – Marcus Hahnemann, American international footballer 
 June 23 – Zinedine Zidane, French international footballer
 August 7 – Goran Vlaović, Croatian footballer
 August 30 – Pavel Nedvěd, Czech international footballer
 September 8 – Markus Babbel, German international footballer and manager
 September 10 – João Carlos dos Santos, Brazilian international footballer 
 September 10 – Mariano Bombarda, Spanish footballer
 October 1 – Jean Paulo Fernandes, Brazilian footballer
 November 2 – Derlis Gómez, Paraguayan footballer
 November 2 – Darío Silva, Uruguayan footballer
 November 4 – Luís Figo, Portuguese international footballer
 November 11 – Nurmat Mirzabaev, Kazakhstani footballer
 December 11 – Andriy Husin, Ukrainian international footballer and coach (died 2014)
 December 29 – Losseni Konaté, Ivorian footballer

Deaths

 June 9 – Caesar ten Cate, Dutch international footballer (born 1890)
 September 16 – Jan de Natris (76), Dutch international footballer (born 1895)

References

 
Association football by year